CP Lacertae (also known as Nova Lacertae 1936 or CP Lac) was a nova, which lit up on June 18, 1936 in the constellation Lacerta. It was discovered independently by several observers including Leslie Peltier in the US, E. Loreta in Italy, and Kazuaki Gomi, a Japanese barber who discovered the nova during the 19 June 1936 total solar eclipse. 

The nova reached a peak brightness of 2.1 mag, making it readily visible to the naked eye during night time. Following the outbreak, the brightness of CP Lacertae decreased thereafter, falling 3 magnitudes after nine days.   It is classified as a very fast nova, with a smooth light curve.

Matter from the red dwarf is being drawn off onto an accretion disk orbiting the white dwarf. The mean brightness of the system varies with an amplitude of 0.5 magnitude from day to day. The observational data shows a general period of 0.037 days, which may be related to the rotation period of the white dwarf component.

Unlike many novae, CP Lacertae does not have a shell visible as a nebula with optical telescopes.

References

Novae
Lacerta (constellation)
1936 in science
Lacertae, CP